Hipnosis (spelt "Hypnosis" for releases outside of Italy) were an Italian Italo disco group, best remembered for their cover of Vangelis' track "Pulstar", which went Top 10 in Germany and Top 20 in Switzerland in 1983. They are also remembered for their hits "Oxygene" (1983), a cover of Jean-Michel Jarre's 1976 superhit and "Droid" (1987).

Discography
"Oxygene"/"Bormaz" (1983) (Germany #39) 
"Pulstar"/"The End" (1983) (Germany #10, Switzerland #19, Austria #14)
"Astrodance"/"Argonauts" (1984)
"Hipnosis" (1984)
"Droid"/"Automatic Piano" (1987)

References

External links
Hipnosis on Discogs

Italian pop music groups
Italo disco groups
Memory Records artists